Sun Media Ltd is a Tauranga based company which publishes a number of newspapers and magazines. Its most commonly known newspaper is The weekend sun which produces 60,000 copies every Friday. Sun Media Ltd also publishes:

Coast & Country - the Bay and Waikato's leading rural publication free monthly.
Waterline magazine - boating, fishing and watersports free monthly.
New Farm Dairies - annual publication showcasing the latest in dairy development.
Sun Live - the Bay's news first. Faster, smarter daily news source. (Website of The weekend sun)

History 

Sun Media Ltd was made in 2000 by Claire and Brian Rogers. Brian is currently the editor with his own column.

Newspapers/Magazines

Waterline Magazine

Waterline Magazine September 2013 Edition-http://issuu.com/sunmedia/docs/wlsep2013/1?e=0

Waterline Magazine June 2013 Edition-http://issuu.com/sunmedia/docs/wljun2013/1?e=0

Waterline Magazine March 2013 Edition-http://issuu.com/sunmedia/docs/wl-mar2013/1?e=0

Coast & Country Magazine

Coast & Country Magazine October 2013 Edition-http://issuu.com/sunmedia/docs/c_caug2013/1?e=0

Coast & Country Magazine July 2013 Edition-http://issuu.com/sunmedia/docs/c_cjuly2013?e=0

References

Mass media in Tauranga
Bay of Plenty Region
Publishing companies of New Zealand